Buhovo is a town in western Bulgaria and a district within the Sofia Capital Municipality. Buhovo is located 15 km southeast of the center of the capital Sofia.

History 
In prehistory, during the middle and late Neolithic (New Stone Age), Buhovo was located 1.5 kilometers east of its current location. Evidence of its previous occupants remains (potsherds, hammers, axes and awls), through which the event is dated. Back then the name of Buhovo was Ursul.

In 1928 the "St. Nicholas" church was built. In 1938, with help from Germany, uranium deposits were developed.

The village of Buhovo was declared a town with Decree 1942 of the State Council of the PRB of 09.04.1974 (Prom. SG. 72 of 17.09.1974).

Landmarks 
 Stadium "Minior"
 A big sports hall
 Monument to the plane of the regiment "Nikola Bonev"
 "St. Maria Magdalena" monastery
 "St. Arhangel Mihail" monastery
 Miraculous icon "Truly Meet" from Mount Athos
 Carting "Buhovo" (formerly)
 Huge rural water fountain used for carpet cleaning.

Regular events 
Annual fair on the last Sunday of June.

Celebrating New Year in front of the Cultural Center.

Towns in Bulgaria
Populated places in Sofia City Province

References